Wobbler may refer to:

 Wobbler (fishing), a type of fishing lure
Wiggler (tool), a centering tool in metalworking
 Wobbler (band), a Norwegian progressive rock band
 Wobbler disease, a neurological condition of dogs and horses
 A crime that could be charged as either a felony or misdemeanor, also called a hybrid offence
 Humorous British slang for a tantrum
 A tool used for precise centering of a workpiece in a lathe
 A toy that shakes back and forth, such as a bobblehead doll or roly-poly toy
 A term for an adherent of the Wahhabism ideology

See also
 
 
 Wobble (disambiguation)